Coopérative des Pêcheurs de Guyane (CODEPEG) is a fishing enterprise in French Guiana. It is based in the capital, Cayenne, and was formed on June 15, 1983. Former directors include Jean-Marie Taubira.

External links
Agrojob.com

Economy of French Guiana
1983 establishments in French Guiana